The 1989–90 Texas Southern Tigers basketball team represented Texas Southern University during the 1989–90 NCAA Division I men's basketball season. The Tigers, led by 15th-year head coach Robert Moreland, played their home games at the Health and Physical Education Arena and were members of the Southwestern Athletic Conference. Texas Southern compiled an overall record of 19–12, and 10–4 in SWAC play, to finish second during the conference regular season. The Tigers won the SWAC tournament to receive an automatic bid to the NCAA tournament – the first in school history. As No. 14 seed in the Midwest region, the team was defeated by 8th-ranked, No. 3 seed Georgetown in the opening round.

Roster

Schedule and results

|-
!colspan=9 style=| Regular season

|-
!colspan=9 style=| SWAC Tournament

|-
!colspan=9 style=| NCAA Tournament

References

Texas Southern Tigers basketball seasons
Texas Southern
Texas Southern
Texas Southern Tigers basketball
Texas Southern Tigers basketball